New York's 119th State Assembly district is one of the 150 districts in the New York State Assembly. It has been represented by Marianne Buttenschon since 2018, replacing Anthony Brindisi.

Geography
District 119 contains portions of Oneida and Herkimer counties, including the cities of Rome and Utica, and the towns of Frankfort and Whitesboro.

Recent election results

2022

2020

2018

2016

2014

2012

References

119
Oneida County, New York
Herkimer County, New York